This is a list of members of the Victorian Legislative Council from the elections on 5 August 1856 to the elections of 31 August to 2 October 1858.

The old unicameral, partly nominated Legislative Council was abolished on 20 March 1856.
On 7 November 1856 the members of the now bicameral and fully elected Victorian Parliament were published in the Government Gazette.
 The new Council first met in November 1856.

There were six Electoral Provinces and five members elected to each Province.

Note the "Term in Office" refers to that members term(s) in the Council, not necessarily for that Province.

 Cruikshank resigned March 1858; replaced by Henry Miller in a by-election May 1858
 Kaye was disqualified for bribery February 1857, replaced by William Highett in a by-election May 1857
 Miller resigned April 1858, replaced by Thomas Howard Fellows in a by-election May 1858
 Previous member of an old district of unicameral Council when it was abolished in March 1856

References

 

Members of the Parliament of Victoria by term
19th-century Australian politicians